John Makula Sentongo (born 1 August 1938) is a Ugandan former boxer. He competed in the men's bantamweight event at the 1960 Summer Olympics. At the 1960 Summer Olympics, he received a bye in the Round of 64, but lost in the Round of 32 to Brunon Bendig of Poland.

References

External links
 

1938 births
Living people
Ugandan male boxers
Olympic boxers of Uganda
Boxers at the 1960 Summer Olympics
People from Kampala District
Commonwealth Games medallists in boxing
Commonwealth Games bronze medallists for Uganda
Boxers at the 1962 British Empire and Commonwealth Games
Bantamweight boxers
Medallists at the 1962 British Empire and Commonwealth Games